Electrical Power Sources For the Electrocution and Extinction of the Human Race... was one of five singles Servotron released in 1996. It was released black vinyl on One Louder Records. The back cover reads: "No human shall be pardoned from its crime of existence."

Track listing 
Side A: "The Power of Electricity"
Side B: "To Be Listed"

The Electroplated Executioners
MACHINE 1: Z4-OBX - 110 V
MACHINE 2: Proto Unit V3 - 220 V
MACHINE 3: 00zX1 - 240 V
MACHINE 4: Gammatron - 440 V
Source:

References

Servotron albums